The 2014–15 season was the 126th season of competitive football by Celtic. They competed in the Scottish Premiership, Scottish League Cup and Scottish Cup. They also competed in the Europa League, having been eliminated in the play-off round of the Champions League.

On 6 June 2014, Ronny Deila was appointed as the club's new manager, succeeding Neil Lennon in the role.

Pre-season and friendlies

Competitions

Scottish Premiership

Results

UEFA Champions League

Second qualifying round

Third qualifying round

Play-Off Round

UEFA Europa League

Knockout phase

Scottish League Cup

Scottish Cup

Squad statistics

Squad, appearances and goals

*Includes league and cup appearances and goals for Dundee United in 2014–15 season

Goalscorers
Last updated 2 June 2015

Disciplinary record
Includes all competitive matches. Players listed below made at least one appearance for Celtic first squad during the season.

* Includes cards from the 2014–15 UEFA Champions League and 2014–15 UEFA Europa League.

Team statistics

League table

Division summary

Europa League group stage table

Technical staff

Transfers

Transfers in 

Total spend: £4.3 million

Transfers out 

Total received: £11.8 million

See also
 List of Celtic F.C. seasons
Nine in a row

Notes

References

Celtic F.C. seasons
Celtic
Scottish football championship-winning seasons